The siege of the Loyola barracks was a siege and uprising at the military barracks in the Loyola neighborhood of San Sebastián, Spain, on 21 July 1936. It was part of the Spanish coup of July 1936 against the Second Spanish Republic, which led to the start of the Spanish Civil War.

Background 
In the Basque province of Álava, the city of Vitoria was easily seized by the rebels led by the general Angel García Benitez and the Colonel Camilo Alonso Vega, but the rising failed in the Biscay and Gipuzkoa provinces.

The Basque nationalists supported the government, established Juntas de Defensa in all the cities and towns, arrested right-wing personalities, and requisitioned their automobiles. There was no military uprising in Bilbao. There was an unsuccessful uprising in San Sebastián, however.

Uprising 
On 19 July 1936, the military governor of San Sebastián, Colonel León Carrasco Amilibia, was arrested, but the commander of the Loyola barracks, Colonel José Vallespín Cobián, encouraged by Emilio Mola, decided to start the uprising against the government.

Vallespín pointed his cannons at the civil government, and the staff inside fled. Carrasco escaped from his captors and declared a state of war. Carrasco established himself with right-wing supporters in the María Cristina hotel, and the Civil Guard in the city supported the rising and seized the Gran Casino.

On 23 July, the Republican forces occupied the María Cristina hotel, and on 27 July, the rebels in the Loyola barracks surrendered to the besieging forces. Spanish anarchists seized the weapons inside the barracks and shot some right-wing prisoners, worsening their relations with the Basque nationalists.

The nationalists occupied San Sebastián on 14 September.

See also 

 List of Spanish Republican military equipment of the Spanish Civil War
 List of Spanish Nationalist military equipment of the Spanish Civil War

Footnotes

Bibliography 
 
 

1936 in Spain
Battles of the Spanish Civil War
Conflicts in 1936
July 1936 events
San Sebastián
Sieges involving Spain
Spanish Civil War massacres